He Ain't Heavy, He's My Father, also known as He Ain't Heavy, He's My Brother (新難兄難弟), is a 1993 Hong Kong comedy-drama film directed by Peter Chan and Lee Chi-ngai and starring Tony Leung Ka-fai, Tony Leung Chiu-wai, Carina Lau, Anita Yuen and Lawrence Cheng. The title is a pun of "He Ain't Heavy, He's My Brother", a hit single for The Hollies in 1969 and for Neil Diamond in 1970.

Plot
Yuen scorns his father, who he thinks is too generous and forgiving. Through a flashback/time travel gimmick, Yuen meets his parents during their joyous courtship. Yuen comes to understand and admire his dad, and reflect on his own moral defects.

Cast
 Tony Leung Ka-fai as Tommy Chor Fan
 Tony Leung Chiu-wai as Chor Yuen
 Carina Lau as Laura Watts
 Anita Yuen as Yee / Lynn
 Lawrence Cheng as Lone / Chuen
 Michael Chow as Mr. Cheung
 Anita Lee as Kan
 Lawrence Ng as Loanshark Fung
 Helen Yung as Yin
 Waise Lee as Li Ka-shing / Fan's neighbor (special appearance)
 Chor Yuen as Lord Watsons (cameo)
 Tsang Kan-wing as Laura's cousin (cameo)
 Poon Fong-fong as Siu-kuen (cameo)
 Pang Mei-seung as Laura's mom
 Valerie Chow as Dr. Jenny Chung
 Wong Wa-wo as Bridge player
 Joe Cheung as Photographer
 Kim Yip as Dr. Chi (Zhivago) / Bass player / rickshawman
 Teddy Chan as Kee
 Jacob Cheung as Uncle Mark Sevrn
 Alexander Chan as Fire Dept worker
 Chan Wing-chiu as Housing Authority staff
 Lee Hiu-tung as Bo-bo
 Hau Woon-ling as Richshaw passenger
 Andrew Kam as Sgt Rocky
 Hoh Wan as Kee's father
 Ng Cheuk-long as Young Chor Yuen
 Wong Hei-yeung as Young Lone
 Quintin Wong as Chow Kut

Adaption
There was a 2009 TVB Adaption of the film taking place in 2008 and then the 1960s. The father of the main character is played by Sunny Chan while the main character is played by Ron Ng.

External links
 
 HK cinemagic entry

Films directed by Peter Chan
1993 films
1990s fantasy comedy-drama films
Hong Kong fantasy comedy-drama films
Films about time travel
1990s Cantonese-language films
Films set in Hong Kong
Films shot in Hong Kong
Films set in the 1960s
Films set in the 1990s
1993 comedy films
1993 drama films
1990s Hong Kong films